Thomas Ruffin Gray (1800 - unknown) was an American attorney who represented several enslaved people during the trials in the wake of Nat Turner's slave rebellion. Though he was not the attorney who represented Nat Turner, instead he interviewed him and wrote The Confessions of Nat Turner.

Early life 
Before his family settled in Southampton County, Virginia they lived in Nottoway Parish, Virginia. But he himself only ever lived in Southampton. He was born sometime in the early 1800s, the exact date is unknown. He was the youngest of six children of Thomas and Anne Cocke Brewer Gray. He grew up as the son of a slave owner and when his grandfather died his father inherited 5 slaves and 400 acres of land.

Their land they owned was next to the plantation of Joseph Ruffin who was Edmund Ruffins's father's cousin. When Joseph Ruffin died, he freed a slave named Charles and also gave one slave to each of Thomas Gray's children. At some point it's believed that Thomas Gray sold these slaves which were called "legacy slaves" and took the money for himself. In Thomas Gray's will he actually threatened to disinherit any of his children to make claims against his property to claim losses, since those slaves technically belonged to his children. They raised hogs and sheep and grew corn and cotton on their land. It was also a family tradition to breed fine horses. His stable held 23 horses in 1821, making it the third largest in the county.

Adulthood 
Gray wanted to live at Round Hill (his dad's house was located here) instead of being involved in law. His mother (Ann Gray) died before 1820 and after this his father began distributing inheritance. When he was 21 his father gave him 400 acres at Round Hill where there was a structure worth about $50. He paid taxes on 2 horses and 14 slaves that were older than 12 that spring. When 1821 comes around he’s built his own house, bringing his property worth up to about $500. He also at some point married Mary A. Gray and had a child with her, Ann Douglas Gray.

Gray said in 1834 that he had studied law in his youth – but there’s no record of him going to college or a law school at any point. There’s a possibility that between 1815 and 1820 he could’ve followed his cousin James as an apprentice to James Rochelle in their county’s clerk’s office – this place occasionally served as a school for lawyers. He and his brother Edwin got involved in court after being involved in a public fight which disturbed the peace. Gray used his supposed knowledge of law from 1819 to 1822 because of this case. In 1827 he had 23 taxable slaves. Then in 1828 he became a Justice of the Peace and served as a magistrate for the first time.

In 1829 he bought his brother Roberts property - who had recently died - (giving him 800 acres of real property), he also bought a lot - a piece of land - in town with a house and got ¾ of another one. In 1830 he becomes a founding member of the Jerusalem Jockey Club. From 1822-1830 was a financially unstable time for his family with his father and Edwin (his brother) falling into debt. Gray tried to help his family but, in the end, he also brought himself down into debt along with them. March of 1830 he was living in town on Main Street. October of 1830, he became certified as an attorney and was allowed to start practicing in court in December. He resigned as a Justice of Peace. Spring of 1831, his family lost essentially all of their taxable slaves, it’s assumed they were forced to sell them because there’s no records of them ever freeing anyone.

Career
In 1824 he would write saying he didn’t have anything else to do but turn to law.  Although he is commonly thought of as Nat Turner's lawyer, James Strange French is the person listed in official records as Turner's lawyer. Neither assertion is correct: William C. Parker was assigned by the court to represent Nat. Gray partook in the military observation of the murders done by the rebellion. Gray was deeply disturbed by the scenes he observed as the group went through the areas treaded by the rebellion. He did find a survivor who was a 12-year-old girl who gave him a recounting of what happened there. (She was found next to a pile of bodies). Gray then worked with Theodore Trezevant at compiling lists of the killed and the defendants. There were a lot of errors in the two trying to name the dead and sometimes survivors were put with the dead by accident. There were 4 revised versions of the amount dead over 4 months. Gray said there was 55 white people killed in each of his 4 revisions (remaining consistent) and he also gave the names of 18 of them. He gave more names than any other person had.

Gray published The Confessions of Nat Turner, which purports to be Turner's confession and account of his life leading up the rebellion, as well as an account of Turner's motives and actions during the rebellion.

Legacy
In the 1960s, William Styron published a fictional and controversial account of the Nat Turner rebellion using the same title as Gray's pamphlet, The Confessions of Nat Turner. Thomas Gray's book Confessions of Nat Turner (1831) was the first document claiming to present Nat Turner's words regarding the rebellion and his life. Although the book is a primary source, future historians and literary scholars have found bias in Gray's writing indicating that Gray had not portrayed Turner's voice as much as he claimed he did. Kenneth S. Greenberg, professor, and Chair of the History Department at Suffolk University explains why Gray's book is not reliable as one may think. In the book Nat Turner: a Slave Rebellion on History and Memory Greenberg state “The Confessions of Nat Turner (a published pamphlet Introduction produced as a result of conversations between Turner and local lawyer Thomas R. Gray), and a scattering of other materials. With the exception of African-American folk memories, every one of the routes into the mind and world of Nat Turner is through sources produced by people who deeply hated the rebels and their leader. Such sources must be analyzed with great care.”

References

19th-century American writers
American lawyers
Nat Turner
19th-century American biographers
People from Southampton County, Virginia